James A. Gold (born January 12, 1947) is the singer-songwriter/guitarist of the 1970s soft rock band Gallery, best known for their 1972 song "Nice to Be with You", written by Gold. Several years later, the group's name was changed to Jim Gold & Gallery.

Gold grew up in Detroit, Michigan and started performing music with his friends around his hometown during his teenage years.

References

External links
Jim Gold and Gallery – official site

1947 births
Living people
American male singer-songwriters
American soft rock musicians
Musicians from Detroit
Singer-songwriters from Michigan